Lacera apicirupta is a moth of the family Erebidae. It is found in Uganda.

References

Moths described in 1965
Lacera